Chin Chin Chinaman is a 1931 British crime film directed by Guy Newall and starring Elizabeth Allan, Leon M. Lion and George Curzon.

It was made at Twickenham Studios as a quota quickie for release by MGM. The film's sets were designed by the art director James A. Carter. When released in the United States it was known by the alternative title of The Boat from Shanghai.

Cast
 Elizabeth Allan as Countess Olga Dureska  
 Leon M. Lion as The Mandarin 
 George Curzon as Colley  
 Picot Schooling as Marie  
 Dino Galvani as Dolange  
 Douglas Blandford as Captain  
 Henry B. Longhurst as Purser  
 Ley On as Chinese servant

References

Bibliography
 Low, Rachael. Filmmaking in 1930s Britain. George Allen & Unwin, 1985.
 Wood, Linda. British Films, 1927-1939. British Film Institute, 1986.

External links

1931 films
British crime films
1931 crime films
Films shot at Twickenham Film Studios
Films directed by Guy Newall
Quota quickies
British black-and-white films
1930s English-language films
1930s British films